Wrong-way driving (WWD), also known as contraflow driving, is the act of driving a motor vehicle against the direction of traffic. It can occur on either one- or two-way roads, as well as in parking lots and parking garages, and may be due to driver inattention or impairment, or because of insufficient or confusing road markings or signage, or a driver from a right-hand traffic country being unaccustomed to driving in a left-hand traffic country (see Left- and right-hand traffic), and vice versa. People intentionally drive in the wrong direction because they missed an exit, for thrill-seeking, or as a shortcut.

Wrong-way driving is particularly dangerous on a divided highway, especially a freeway; the higher speeds typical of such roads mean that wrong-way driving invariably leads to a head-on collision. In the United States, about 355 people are killed each year in crashes caused by drivers headed in the wrong direction on the highway. Given an average of 265 fatal WWD crashes, 1.34 fatalities per WWD fatal crash can be calculated. The significance of these kind of crashes is corroborated when this number is compared to the fatalities per fatal crash rate of 1.10 for all other crash types, which translates to 24 more fatalities per 100 fatal crashes for WWD crashes than for fatal crashes in general. Most drivers who enter a divided highway or ramp in the wrong direction correct themselves by turning around.

Depending on the jurisdiction, WWD is a punishable offense. In New Zealand, WWD is counted as careless driving and can result in up to 5 years imprisonment and/or a fine up to NZ$10,000.

Efforts to reduce wrong-way driving
One of the aims of highway engineering is to reduce wrong-way driving. Therefore, many nations, including the U.S., Japan, and Canada, have made great efforts to combat this issue, especially in the recent years.

United States

National Transportation Safety Board's Highway Special Investigation Report 
This topic of safety has gained renewed attention in the recent years in the United States. In doing so, the National Transportation Safety Board (NTSB) published a special investigation report about wrong-way driving in which relevant safety countermeasures to prevent wrong-way collisions on high-speed, divided highways are identified. One important part of this report is Section 4 which provides recommendations for different agencies, including Federal Highway Administration and NHTSA, to address wrong-way collisions.

2013 National Wrong-Way Driving Summit
The first National Wrong-Way Driving Summit was held July 18 and 19, 2013, at the Morris University Center (MUC) of Southern Illinois University Edwardsville (SIUE). The purpose of this summit,  sponsored by the Illinois Center for Transportation (ICT) and Illinois Department of Transportation (IDOT), was to provide a platform for practitioners and researchers to exchange ideas, evaluate current countermeasures, and develop best practices to reduce wrong-way crashes and incidents through a 4E’s approach (Engineering, Education, Enforcement, and Emergency Response).

To enhance the quality of this summit, a significant number of attendees were brought together to discuss various topics during individual presentations, as well as to take part in broader topical group discussions. Overall, approximately 130 attendees from 23 states participated in this summit, including from states that have already implemented and tested various countermeasures and those in which wrong-way driving has been found to be a major of concern.

Summit organizers also published the proceeding of the summit in May 2014 that contains all the presentations as well as the results of a survey questionnaire distributed to all the attendees to gather the latest information about the current practices for mitigating wrong-way driving issues. The proceedings of the Summit, along with additional research and investigation effort, resulted in the preparation and publication of the Guidelines for Reducing Wrong-Way Crashes on Freeways, a cooperative effort of IDOT, ICT, and FHWA.

Wrong-Way Driving Guidebook 
In May 2014, ICT and IDOT published Guidelines for Reducing Wrong-Way Crashes on Freeways. The researchers compiled the guidebook by reviewing previous studies, assessing current practices, and examining national and state design standards and manuals that pertain to WWD. The research team also obtained significant information from the National Wrong-Way Driving Summit hosted by IDOT and SUIE as part of this project in July 2013.

Overview of Wrong-Way Driving Fatal Crashes in the United States
In August 2014, Institute of Transportation Engineers published a paper to provide an overview of the general trend of WWD fatal crashes in the United States; discuss general characteristics of WWD fatal crashes; and delineate significant contributing factors. The researchers found an average of 269 fatal crashes resulting in 359 deaths occurred annually in the United States during an 8-year period covering the years 2004 through 2011.  It was found that Texas, California, and Florida account for the highest number of WWD fatal crashes and fatalities and represent almost one-third of the national totals.

ATSSA's wrong-way driving executive summary
The American Traffic Safety Services Association (ATSSA), in February 2014, published a document titled "Emerging Safety Countermeasures for Wrong-way Driving" that was developed in the framework of an executive summary of various case studies that aim at providing transportation practitioners with a good understanding of WWD incidents and emerging safety countermeasures. In addition to bringing available information together in one document, contacts were suggested for each case study to help readers get at least additional the complementary information about each countermeasure they are considering.

See also 
Wrong-way driving warning

References

 
Hazardous motor vehicle activities
Road safety
Traffic law